The following is a list of clones of Sinclair Research's ZX80 and ZX81 home computers:

ZX80
 MicroAce (1980, USA)
 Microdigital TK80 (1981, Brazil)
 Nova Electrônica/Prológica NE-Z80 (1981, Brazil)

ZX81

Official clones
 Timex Sinclair T/S 1000 is a ZX81 with the same circuit board from the same factory, but with a 2K x 8 RAM chip instead of 1K. This is typically a U.S. model, with a VHF (NTSC) RF modulator and slightly improved RF shielding, but are the same BASIC machine.
 Timex Sinclair T/S 1500 is a ZX81 in a ZX Spectrum like case.
 Lambda Electronics Lambda 8300 (a 1983 clone, also branded as PC 8300, DEF 3000, Basic 2000, Marathon 32K, Tonel PC, Unisonic Futura 8300, PC-81 Personal Computer, CAC-3, Polybrain P118, Creon Electronics Power 3000 or NF300 jiaoXueDianNao)

Brazilian clones
 Microdigital TK82 (ZX80 case, 1981)
 Microdigital TK82C (smaller case and 2K RAM, 1981)
 Microdigital TK83 (same case as original, but golden instead of black, 1982)
 Microdigital TK85 (ZX Spectrum case and 16K or 48K RAM, 1983)
 Prológica CP-200 (inverted video and larger case, 1982)
 Prologica CP200S
 cdSE Microcomputadores (Centro de Desenvolvimento de Sistemas Elétricos Ind. Com. Ltda.) Apply 300
 Ritas do Brasil Ringo R470 (1983)
 Nova Electrônica/Prológica NE-Z8000 (1982)
 Engebrás AS-1000 (1984)

Argentinean clones
 Czerweny CZ 1000 (1985)
 Czerweny CZ 1500 (1985)
 Czerweny CZ 1000 Plus (1986)
 Czerweny CZ 1500 Plus  (1986)

South Korean clones
 Samsung SPC-300
 GoldStar FC-30
 Boeun Peek PC-1000 (Timex Sinclair 1000 compatible, 1983)

Modern clones
In recent years retrocomputing enthusiasts created various clones of the ZX80/ZX81.
 ZX81+38 
 ZX80/ZX81 Double Clone  and related ZX80/ZX81 Project 
 ZX97 
 Minstrel 
 Wilco/Baffa's one 
 TELLAB TL801, an Italian clone designed in 2002 that can emulate both the ZX80 or ZX81. Selection between machines is made via a jumper.

References

External links

 Planet Sinclair: Computers: Clones and Variants
 Sinclair Nostalgia Products — Sinclair Clones

ZX80 and ZX81 clones
Lists of computer hardware
Sinclair ZX80 clones
Sinclair ZX81 clones
ZX80